Shahrak-e Jafariyeh (also Romanized as Shahrak-e Ja‘farīyeh; also known as Ja‘farīyeh) is a village in Malard-e Jonubi Rural District of the Central District of Malard County, Tehran province, Iran. At the 2006 National Census, its population was 7,856 in 1,933 households, when it was in the former Malard District of Shahriar County. The following census in 2011 counted 10,788 people in 2,936 households, by which time the district had been separated from the county and Malard County established. The latest census in 2016 showed a population of 9,452 people in 2,696 households; it was the largest village in its rural district.

References 

Malard County

Populated places in Tehran Province

Populated places in Malard County